Aspas or Espas may refer to:

People
Aspas of Sassan
Iago Aspas

Places
 Aspas, Fars
 Espas, Zanjan
 Aspas Rural District, in Fars Province